Mike Jakubo may refer to:

 Mike Jakubo (ice hockey) (born 1947), Canadian ice hockey player
 Mike Jakubo (curler) (born 1982), Canadian curler